Only one ship of the United States Navy has been named USS Tallahassee, after the city of Tallahassee, Florida, but two others were projected to carry the name.

 The first  was an  monitor used as a submarine tender during World War I, originally named USS Florida and later redesignated IX-16.
 The second  was converted from a  light cruiser to the   before launching.
 The third  was a  light cruiser that was cancelled before launching.

United States Navy ship names
Culture of Tallahassee, Florida